Malcolm Macdonald  is a Scottish space technology engineer, academic, and director. He is a Professor and the Chair of Applied Space Technology at the University of Strathclyde, and a visiting professor at University College Dublin. He was Director of the Scottish Centre of Excellence in Satellite Applications, SoXSA, from 2014 - 2020, and a non-executive member of the UK Space Agency Steering Board from 2017 - 2020. He is an acknowledged expert in space research, and in 2021 was referred to in the media as "Scotland's leading space expert".

Education
Malcolm Macdonald studied at University of Glasgow, graduating with a first in Aerospace engineering in 2000. He completed his doctoral research in Astrodynamics at University of Glasgow from then until the end of 2002, graduating in 2005, where we studied with Colin R. McInnes.

Career and research
After completing his doctoral research Macdonald continued to work with Colin R. McInnes as his Research Assistant until the end of 2004. In 2005 Macdonald joined SCISYS where he worked on projects including LISA Pathfinder and ADM-Aeolus, prior to joining the University of Strathclyde in 2008.

Macdonald describes himself as "a professional space technology engineer, working in academia". His research is in space technology, including small satellites and solar sails, as well as astrodynamics, and network science. He was awarded the 2016 Royal Society of Edinburgh Sir Makdougall Brisbane Medal, for "outstanding research work in the development and application of space mission systems to challenge conventional ideas and advance new concepts in the exploration and exploitation of space." He was elected a fellow of the Royal Society of Edinburgh in 2021.

Macdonald was the only non-US member of a National Academies of Sciences, Engineering, and Medicine's committee on Achieving Science Goals with CubeSats, and a member of the Committee on Space Research (COSPAR) Study Group on Small Satellites for Space Sciences. He was also a member of International Academy of Astronautics study group 4.23 on Post-Mission Disposal for Micro and Smaller Satellites: Concepts and Trade Studies.

Macdonald has been an associate editor of the American Institute of Aeronautics and Astronautics (AIAA) Journal of Guidance, Control, and Dynamics since 2009, and led the development of The International Handbook of Space Technology, as well as contributing several chapters. This Handbook has sixty contributing authors, including high-profile contributors from Japan, Europe, and the US, including a foreword by Elon Musk.

Macdonald is also involved in the commercialisation of space through his role as the director of the Scottish Centre of Excellence in Satellite Applications, which supports the application of space data and services as well as the development of technology that enables this data and services. He also founded the Data.Space conference, held annually in Glasgow, and which attracts c-suite speakers and thought leaders from across the world.

Outreach and media

Macdonald is frequently quoted by national and international media on topics relating to the space industry, and is a regular contributor to BBC Radio and Television, including BBC Radio Scotland shows such as Good Morning Scotland and Drive Time, as well as appearing on television shows such as the BBC Daily Politics Show and STV's Scotland Tonight.

Macdonald is also the co-creator & co-producer of a so-called science quiz show, New Peers Review, which is broadcast on Deutsche Welle's Spectrum radio show.

He also regularly delivers talks to branches of learned societies, such as the Royal Aeronautical Society and the Institute of Physics, as well as to local science, engineering, and astronomy clubs. He has also worked with the BBC to broaden understanding of issues related to space, such as the re-entry of Tiangong-1, with CBeebies programme Nina and the Neurons for the episode Earth Explorers, and with BBC Radio Scotland to put a Red Nose into near-space for Comic Relief in 2013.

Awards and honours
Recognition of his engineering achievements includes:

2021 Knowledge Exchange Champion of the Year, Scottish Knowledge Exchange Awards 
2021 Fellowship of the Royal Society of Edinburgh (FRSE)
2016 Royal Society of Edinburgh Sir Makdougall Brisbane Medal
2013 Fellowship of the Royal Aeronautical Society (FRAeS)
2013 Elected member Royal Society of Edinburgh Young Academy of Scotland, five-year term.
2012 Best Scottish Knowledge Transfer Partnership Award, with Clyde Space Ltd.
2011 Sir Arthur C. Clarke Award for Space Research Achievement, awarded to the Advanced Space Concepts Laboratory
2010 Times Higher Education, THE, Outstanding Engineering Research Team of the Year shortlist nomination.
2009 Associate Fellow of the American Institute of Aeronautics and Astronautics
2008 Registered European Engineer with the European Federation of National Engineering Associations. Registration No. 571998.
2008 Engineering Council UK Chartered Engineer (UK)
2003 Ackroyd Stuart Propulsion Prize (2003) awarded by the Royal Aeronautical Society

References

Bibliography
 The International Handbook of Space Technology Editors: Macdonald, Malcolm, Badescu, Viorel (Eds.), Springer-Verlag Berlin Heidelberg, 2014, 
 Advances in Solar Sailing Editor: Macdonald, Malcolm (Eds.), Springer-Verlag Berlin Heidelberg, 2014, 
 Macdonald, Malcolm, Smith, Lesley Jane, Impact Assessment of Scottish Independence on the Space Sector, University of Strathclyde publishing, 2014,  University of Strathclyde publishing - Impact Assessment of Scottish Independence on the Space Sector

External links
 Staff Profile - Prof Malcolm Macdonald, University of Strathclyde

Aerospace engineers
Space systems engineers
Academics of the University of Strathclyde
Fellows of the Royal Aeronautical Society
Fellows of the Royal Society of Edinburgh
Alumni of the University of Glasgow
Engineers from Glasgow
Scottish aerospace engineers
20th-century British engineers
21st-century British engineers
1978 births
Living people